Ananya Shah, better known as Dipa Shah, is an Indian actress who works mainly in South Indian films, television productions, and commercials.

Career
Shah started her film career in 2009, her debut film Ninnu Kalisaka. In 2010, she acted in Yuddham Sei, where she played a trainee police officer. The film was released on 4 February 2011.

She appeared in the film Sillunu Oru Sandhippu. She played Charu, a homely, reserved but strong-minded girl from Ooty. She also has a Malayalam movie, China Town to her credit as well.

Filmography

References

External links
 

Living people
Gujarati people
Indian film actresses
Actresses in Malayalam cinema
Actresses in Tamil cinema
Year of birth missing (living people)
Actresses from Mumbai
Actresses in Telugu cinema
21st-century Indian actresses